Flintstones Chewable Vitamins are a supplemental multivitamin for children, shaped like the characters of the animated sitcom The Flintstones. They were introduced in 1968 by Miles Laboratories and taste sweet like candy. Miles Laboratories was acquired by Bayer in 1979.

The vitamins are a very successful dietary supplement.  The jingle tagline, "We are Flintstones Kids, Ten Million Strong and Growing..." (music by Martin O'Donnell, lyric by Jim Morris), became famous through heavy advertising.

The vitamins are widely available. They feature vitamins in the shapes of the Flintstones characters: Fred Flintstone, Wilma Flintstone, Pebbles Flintstone, Barney Rubble, Betty Rubble, Bamm-Bamm Rubble, Dino, and The Great Gazoo. For over twenty years, Betty was not included as one of the vitamins.  However, after a grassroots campaign and the results of a Bayer telephone poll came in favor of including Betty, the character was added to the lineup in 1995, replacing the Flintstone car.

Available products
Flintstones Chewable Vitamins are currently available in six variations:
Flintstones Complete
Flintstones with Iron
Flintstones Plus Omega-3 DHA
Flintstones Plus Immunity Support
Flintstones Plus Bone Building Support
My First Flintstones

Flintstones Complete
Flintstones Complete comes in three forms: chewable, gummy and sour gummy.

It is designed for children two years of age and older. Flintstones Complete has a high supplementation of iron, iodine, vitamin D and vitamin E.  Vitamin D is necessary for the maintenance and growth of bones in children. Vitamin D deficiency is a concern for infants, especially in the Northern Hemisphere. This is because infants often have very limited exposure to sunlight, which is the main source of endogenous Vitamin D production. Vitamin D deficiency can result in rickets, a disease in which bones become soft and pliable. Vitamin E is a potent anti-oxidant in the body. Vitamin E deficiencies leads to neuromuscular, vascular and reproductive abnormalities.

The chewable form of Flintstones Complete contains higher amounts of vitamins and minerals than the gummy version. The chewable form, unlike the gummy version, contains: Vitamins B1 (thiamin), B2 (riboflavin), Niacin, Calcium, Iron, Copper and Selenium.

Flintstones with Iron
Flintstones with Iron has a similar vitamin profile as Flintstones Complete gummy version. The iron content meets 75% of the Daily Value of iron for children over two years of age.

Flintstones Plus Immunity Support

Flintstones Plus Immunity Support has a similar vitamin profile as Flintstones Complete gummy version. However, Flintstones Plus Immunity Support provides 250 mg of Vitamin C, which far exceeds the recommended dietary allowance (RDA) for children. The RDA of vitamin C for children 1 – 3 years of age is 15 mg; 4 – 8 years of age is 25 mg; 9 – 14 years of age is 45 mg. The dosage of Vitamin C in one tablet of Flintstones Plus Immunity Support Vitamin C is still below the tolerable upper intake levels (UL). The UL for children 1–3 years of age is 400 mg; 4–8 years of age is 650 mg; 9–11 years of age is 1200 mg. Parents should not give their child more than the recommended dose of Flintstones Plus Immunity Support because they can easily exceed their child's UL for vitamin C. This can lead to adverse effects, such as diarrhea and kidney stones.

Notes and references

External links
Flintstones Vitamins website with nutrition information
Flintstones Vitamins Canadian website

Vitamins
The Flintstones
Bayer brands
Products introduced in 1968